Samuel Earl Oosterhoff  (born August 22, 1997) is a  Canadian politician. Oosterhoff is currently the Member of Provincial Parliament (MPP) for the riding of Niagara West. Oosterhoff is a member of the Progressive Conservative Party of Ontario and was first elected at the age of 19 in a November 2016 byelection, the youngest Ontario MPP to ever be elected. The previous record was held by Reid Scott who was elected as a Co-operative Commonwealth Federation MPP in 1948 at the age of 21.

Early life and career
Oosterhoff was born and raised in Vineland, Ontario, where he lived with his parents at the time of the byelection. He is a member of the Canadian Reformed Church.

Before being nominated, Oosterhoff  had briefly worked as legislative assistant and policy analyst on Parliament Hill in Ottawa. At the time of his election, he was in the middle of his first year studying political science at Brock University, which he entered  after being homeschooled. After his election, he planned to resume his studies in January 2017 with night classes and summer school.

Politics
In October 2016, Oosterhoff was nominated as the Progressive Conservative candidate in Niagara West—Glanbrook to replace Tim Hudak, who resigned his seat that September. Former MP and current president of the Progressive Conservative Party of Ontario Rick Dykstra was the favoured candidate by both the party establishment and PC leader Patrick Brown, but Oosterhoff had more local support, including that of his church.

Social conservatives such as Charles McVety accused Brown of muzzling Oosterhoff during the campaign because of the candidate's opposition to the new sexual education curriculum. On November 17, 2016, Oosterhoff defeated New Democratic challenger Mike Thomas by 9,528 votes.

He was sworn in as an MPP on November 30, one day after Nathalie Des Rosiers, who also won a byelection on November 17, was sworn in. Critics said the delay was to keep Oosterhoff out of the legislature for a vote on Bill 28 which was unanimously passed on November 29. Bill 28 made it easier for same-sex couples to become legal parents, and Oosterhoff had previously voiced objections to the bill saying he "definitely would not have supported it" and that it was "disrespectful to mothers and fathers". Brown said the delay was so that Oosterhoff could organize a celebration party for his family and supporters.

Oosterhoff is a social conservative, and believes that abortion and same-sex marriage should be illegal. However, in 2016 he stated that he is “absolutely not” a homophobe.

On March 7, 2017, Oosterhoff defeated PC vice-president and Niagara Regional Councillor Tony Quirk for the PC nomination for the next provincial election in the new constituency of Niagara West, which replaced Niagara West—Glanbrook as a result of federal redistribution.

Oosterhoff picked up 24,361 (52.74%) of the vote in the 2018 Ontario general election, defeating NDP candidate Curtis Fric. On June 29, 2018, Oosterhoff was appointed to the role of Parliamentary Assistant to Lisa Thompson, the Minister of Education.
Oosterhoff was widely criticized on April 20, 2018 for his televised rendition of African-American spiritual 'Nobody Knows the Trouble I've Seen' given his socially conservative views and trouble-free middle class upbringing.

On October 31, 2018, Halloween, Oosterhoff celebrated the passing of the Cap and Trade Cancellation Act with a rendition of "Monster Mash" at Queen's Park.

In May 2019, Oosterhoff participated in an anti-abortion rally at Queen's Park hosted by March for Life, where he made a stage appearance. During his speech at the rally, he said that "We have survived 50 years of abortion in Canada and we pledge to fight to make abortion unthinkable in our lifetime."

In October 2020, amid the COVID-19 pandemic in Ontario, Oosterhoff took group photos with about forty people in a banquet hall, none of whom were wearing masks or social distancing, which was contrary to provincial public health measures. Oosterhoff deleted the photos and apologized, saying that he should have worn a mask and that except for the photograph, the group had otherwise distanced.

Personal life 
In 2019, Oosterhoff married Keri Nicole (née Ludwig). They have one son;

 Sullivan Oosterhoff (born January 21, 2021 in St. Catharines, Ontario)

Electoral results

References

External links

1997 births
21st-century Canadian politicians
Canadian Calvinist and Reformed Christians
Living people
People from the Regional Municipality of Niagara
Progressive Conservative Party of Ontario MPPs